Ratul may refer to
Ratul Puri, Indian business executive
Ratul Shankar, Indian percussionist and actor 

Indian masculine given names